Keele is a village and civil parish in the Borough of Newcastle-under-Lyme in Staffordshire, England. It is approximately three miles (5 km) west of Newcastle-under-Lyme, and is close to the village of Silverdale. Keele lies on the A53 road from Newcastle-under-Lyme to Market Drayton and Shrewsbury. The village is the location of Keele University (at ) and Keele Services, a motorway service area on the M6.

Keele is located in the Keele ward of the borough of Newcastle-under-Lyme with its name drawing from the old Anglo-Saxon Cȳ-hyll = "Cow-hill". The 2001 census indicated the parish had a population of 3,664,(increasing to 4,129 at the 2011 census) most of whom students at Keele University as one of the halls of residence, Hawthorns, now sold for land redevelopment, was located in the heart of the village.

The Knights Templars & Hospitallers
The village is recognised for its association with the university and its position astride the M6.  But during the Middle Ages, Keele was a major route from the North-West to London for laden packhorses and caravans alike. Keele Preceptory was granted to the Knights Templar sometime between 1168 and 1169 by King Henry II. The Knights Templars, military order and later rivals Knights Hospitallers, would charge incoming traffic to pass through their lands. This would supplement rental income from farming tenants.

Little remains today of the Templar's heritage and less so of the Hospitallers.  Erected during the 1992 bypass between Newcastle-under Lyme and Madeley to improve circulation in the village, an iron sculpture celebrates the arrival of the former at Keele.  Additionally, one University hall of residence, Holly Cross, located on the estate and shaped in a Templar Cross, commemorates their presence.  The parish church is named after the patron saint of the Hospitallers, St John the Baptist, and it is believed that one of the church's stained glass panels still contains elements of surviving early medieval glass.

Keele Estate & the Sneyd Family
From the mid 15th Century until the 1940s, the Sneyd family owned much of the village (cottages, school, farm, Inn), dominating local life architecturally as well as socially and receiving rents from villagers and tenants.  The inhabitants were principally employed in collieries and iron works, notably in Silverdale, also belonging to the Sneyds.

During the Second World War the estate was requisitioned by the British government for the British Army. Various training activities were carried out until the arrival of American servicemen in 1944. They occupied over 100 temporary buildings and Nissen Huts. General Patton visited during this period. Some prisoners of war were held locally during the war and after the war it became a camp for Polish servicemen and displaced persons.

University College of North Staffordshire
In 1948, with accumulated gambling debts amassed by the late Ralph Sneyd and high tax duties, the estate (including village outlets) was sold off by remaining relatives to Stoke-on-Trent Corporation. The land was earmarked for the development of the new University College of North Staffordshire, which was founded in 1949, opened in 1950 and received its royal charter as Keele University in 1962.

In the village, a collection of buildings, collectively known as the Hawthorns, named after a 19th-century medieval farmhouse were erected and became home to students. The first students took up residence in Hawthorns House in 1957 and the expanded residential complex was discontinued in 2017. The Sneyd Arms remains popular with the student community.

Keele is featured on the UK 'Here and Now' edition of the board game Monopoly, released in September 2007, It takes the place of Fleet Street in the traditional version.

Notable people 
 Walter Sneyd (1752–1829) of Keele Hall, MP for Castle Rising in 1784–1790
 Grand Duke Michael Mikhailovich of Russia (1861–1929) lived in Keele Hall between 1900 and 1909. 
 Major General William Donovan Stamer CB, CBE, DSO, MC (1895 in Keele – 1963) a British Army officer in the North Staffordshire Regiment

Transport
Keele is served by a bus service between Newcastle-Under-Lyme and Nantwich via Crewe and also is served by a bus service to Stoke-on-Trent via Newcastle-Under-Lyme and Stone.

Keele was also served by Keele railway station which was on the former Stoke-Market Drayton Line from 1870 to 1956, although the line remained in use for freight traffic until 1998 when the line was closed to Silverdale Colliery and the track was removed up Pipe Gate railway station to north Silverdale railway station. The tracks remain in place but heavily overgrown and for potential future use if the line ever reopened.

See also
Listed buildings in Keele

Gallery

References

External links 

Keele University Website

Villages in Staffordshire
Borough of Newcastle-under-Lyme